Leales Department is a department in Tucumán Province, Argentina. It has a population of 57,235 (2001) and an area of 540 km². The seat of the department is in Lules.

Municipalities and communes
El Manantial
Lules
San Felipe y Santa Bárbara
San Pablo y Villa Nougués

Notes
This article includes content from the Spanish Wikipedia article Departamento Lules.

Departments of Tucumán Province